Tunga Mahavidyalaya is located at the foothills of Anandagiri in Thirthahalli Town.  Tunga Mahavidyalaya "is the offspring of" Tunga Vidyavardhaka Sangha - an association of the philanthropists. Thirthahalli Taluk is the birthplace of great writers, artists, Jurists and political leaders. Popular Kannada film actor Diganth is alumnus of this institute.

Postgraduate Departments
 Department of Mcom [Master of commerce]

Undergraduate Departments 

 Department of Arts.
 Department of Science.
 Department of Commerce.

Pre-university Courses 
 Arts
 Commerce
 Science

Undergraduate programs 
 Bachelor of Commerce
 Bachelor of arts
 Bachelor of Science
 Bachelor of computer application

Activities 

The institute organizes co-curricular and extra curricular activities.

 NCC - National Cadet Corps
 NSS - National Service Scheme

References

External links 
 'Karnataka DCE'

Colleges in Karnataka
Universities and colleges in Shimoga district
Kuvempu University